is a Japanese novelist born in Fukuoka, Fukuoka Prefecture, Japan.

Biography 
Best known for his humorous mysteries, Akagawa's first short story, "Ghost Train", was published in 1976 and went on to win the annually granted All Yomimono New Mystery Writers' Prize by Bungeishunjū, a Japanese literary publishing company. His most recognized works to date pertain to his Mike-neko (or Calico cat) Holmes series. He is extremely prolific; as of 2013, he had written more than 560 novels in the course of his thirty-year career, over 300 million individual published volumes.

Works in English translation
Mystery novel
 Three Sisters Investigate (original title: San Shimai Tanteidan), trans. Gavin Frew (Kodansha International, Kodansha English Library, 1985)

Short story collection
 Midnight Suite (original title: Mayonaka no tame no Kumikyoku), trans. Gavin Frew (Kodansha International, Kodansha English Library, 1984)
 
 
 
 
 

Short story
 Beat Your Neighbor Out of Doors (Ellery Queen's Mystery Magazine, March 1992)

Essay
 My Favourite Mystery, "And Then There Were None" by Agatha Christie (Mystery Writers of Japan, Inc. )

Awards and nominations
 1976 – All Yomimono New Mystery Writers' Prize (for unpublished short stories): "Ghost Train" (short story)
 1979 – Nominee for Mystery Writers of Japan Award for Best Novel: Himatsubushi no Satsujin
 1979 – Nominee for Mystery Writers of Japan Award for Best Short Story: "Zennin Mura no Mura Matsuri"
 1980 – Kadokawa Novel Prize: Akusai ni Sasageru Rekuiemu (novel)
 1980 – Nominee for Naoki Prize: "Uwayaku no Inai Getsuyobi", "Kinshu no Hi" and "Toho Jugo fun" (three short stories)
 1980 – Nominee for Yoshikawa Eiji Prize for New Writers: Mike-neko Homuzu no Kaidan (novel)
 1982 – Nominee for Mystery Writers of Japan Award for Best Short Story: "Kaidan"
 2006 – Japan Mystery Literature Award for Lifetime Achievement

Main works

Calico Cat Holmes
Novels
, 1978
, 1979
, 1980
, 1981
, 1981
, 1982
, 1983
, 1985
, 1986
, 1987
, 1988
, 1990
, 1990
, 1991
, 1991
, 1992
, 1993
, 1994
, 1995
, 1995
, 1996
, 1997
, 1998
, 2000
, 2001
, 2002
, 2003
, 2005
, 2006
, 2007
, 2008
, 2009
, 2011
, 2012
, 2013
Short story collections
, 1983
, 1984
, 1984
, 1986
, 1988
, 1989
, 1992
, 1993
, 1996
, 1997
, 1998
, 1999
, 2002
, 2009

Three Sisters Investigate
 Novels
, 1982 (English translation: Three Sisters Investigate. Kodansha International, Kodansha English Library. 1985)
, 1985
, 1986
, 1987
, 1988
, 1989
, 1990
, 1991
, 1992
, 1993
, 1994
, 1995
, 1996
, 1997
, 1998
, 1999
, 2000
, 2002
, 2003
, 2005
, 2007
, 2011
, 2013

Hayakawa family series
Novels
, 1978 (French translation: Meurtres pour tuer le temps. Philippe Picquier Publishing.)
, 1987
, 2000

Standalone novels
 , 1978
 , 1981 (French translation: Le piège de la marionnette. Philippe Picquier Publishing.)

Film adaptations
 Sailor Suit and Machine Gun (1981)
 Detective Story (1983)
 Early Spring Story (1985)
 Who Do I Choose? (1989)
 Chizuko's Younger Sister (1991)

TV drama adaptations 

 Mike-Neko Holmes Series (1979 - 1984)
 Mike-Neko Holmes no Suiri (2012)

Video game adaptations 
 Majotachi no Nemuri
Based on Akagawa's two thriller novels Majotachi no Tasogare and Majotachi no Nagai Nemuri.
 Akagawa Jirō: Majotachi no Nemuri (Super Famicom – 1995)
 Akagawa Jirō: Majotachi no Nemuri: Fukkatsusai (PlayStation – 1999)
 Akagawa Jirō: Majotachi no Nemuri: Kanzenban (PC – 2001)

Yasōkyoku
 Akagawa Jirō: Yasōkyoku (PlayStation – 1998) (based on Akagawa's short story collection Satsujin o Yonda Hon)
 Akagawa Jirō: Yasōkyoku 2 (PlayStation – 2001)
 Akagawa Jirō Mystery: Yasōkyoku – Hon ni Manekareta Satsujin (Nintendo DS – 2008)

Others
 Akagawa Jirō no Yurei Ressha (Family Computer – 1991) (based on Akagawa's short story "Ghost Train")
 Tsuki no Hikari: Shizumeru Kane no Satsujin (PlayStation 2 – 2002) (based on Akagawa's novel Shizumeru Kane no Satsujin)
 Akagawa Jirō Mystery: Tsuki no Hikari (Nintendo DS – 2008) (based on Akagawa's novel Shizumeru Kane no Satsujin)

Unique Games
 Emit Vol. 1: Toki no Maigo (Scenario writing by Akagawa Jirō. Also bundled in the Emit Value Pack compilation)
 Emit Vol. 2: Inochigake no Tabi (Scenario writing by Akagawa Jirō. Also bundled in the Emit Value Pack compilation)
 Emit Vol. 3: Watashi ni Sayonara o (Scenario writing by Akagawa Jirō. Also bundled in the Emit Value Pack compilation)

See also
Japanese detective fiction

References 

 J'Lit | Authors : Jiro Akagawa | Books from Japan
 List of video games at GameFAQs
 Akagawa Jirō no Yūrei Ressha at MobyGames
 Akagawa Jirou Majotachi no Nemuri (Super Famicom) at Superfamicom.org
 Akagawa Jirō Mystery: Tsuki no Hikari – Shizumeru Kane no Satsujin at MobyGames
 Tsuki no Hikari: Shizumeru Kane no Satsujin at Gamefaqs
 Emit series at vndb.org

1948 births
Living people
20th-century Japanese novelists
21st-century Japanese novelists
Japanese male short story writers
Japanese mystery writers
Japanese horror writers
Writers of young adult literature
Writers from Fukuoka (city)
20th-century Japanese short story writers
21st-century Japanese short story writers
20th-century Japanese male writers
21st-century male writers